Andělská Hora (earlier also Engelsberg) is a municipality and village in Karlovy Vary District in the Karlovy Vary Region of the Czech Republic. It has about 400 inhabitants.

Geography
It is located in the Slavkov Forest.

Sights
Ruins of Andělská Hora Castle are located in the municipality.

Notable people
Henry V, Burgrave of Plauen (1533–1568), nobleman

References

External links

 

Villages in Karlovy Vary District